Hampreston is a small village in the civil parish of Ferndown in East Dorset, southern England. Before 1972, the whole parish took the name of Hampreston, with its population rising from 1,860 in 1921 to 11,750 in 1971.

The village has a school, an Anglican parish church and a farm shop.

The folk singer Bob Roberts was born in Hampreston.

References

External links

Villages in Dorset